The Osprey class are a series of coastal minehunters designed to find, classify, and destroy moored and bottom naval mines from vital waterways.

Their design is based on the second series of the Italian Lerici-class, built in La Spezia by Intermarine between 1990 and 1996. Eight vessels were built in the Intermarine shipyard located in Savannah, while the remaining four have been built by a second-source shipyard under a Technology Transfer and Licence Agreement.

They use sonar and video systems, cable cutters and a mine detonating device that can be released and detonated by remote control. The Osprey class are the world's second largest minehunters (surpassed by the Royal Navy's  s) to be constructed entirely of fiberglass and designed to survive the shock of underwater explosions. Their primary mission is reconnaissance, classification, and neutralization of all types of moored and bottom mines in littoral areas, harbors and coastal waterways.

Construction
Twelve minehunter ships were built for the U.S. Navy by Northrop Grumman Ship Systems (formerly Litton Avondale Industries) of New Orleans and Intermarine of Savannah. The ships were commissioned between 1993 and 1999. The ships of this class were named after various types of birds.

When carrying a full load they displace . They have four decks, and have a complement of five officers, four chief petty officers, and 42 enlisted men. They are armed with two .50 caliber machine guns. All of the major equipment is suspended from the main deck in glass-reinforced plastic holders, so that in the event of an undersea explosion, it will not be damaged.

They use an AN/SLQ-53 deep sweep mine countermeasures system. They also use an AN/SQQ-32 Variable Depth Sonar, which is tethered to the front of the bridge, to detect and identify mines using multiple ping processing. Two AN/UYK-44 computers are also used to classify and detect mines. For surface radar purposes, an AN/SPS-64(V)9 is used. They have two AN/UYQ-31 operator data terminals, which are identical.

They are propelled by two Isotta Fraschini ID 36 SS 8V AM diesel engines which drive two Voith Schneider cycloidal propellers generating , and have three Isotta Fraschini ID 36 diesel generators. They use a single bow thruster, which generates , in order to run silently.

Decommissioning
All of these ships were decommissioned in 2006–07.

The U.S. General Services Administration (GS) announced in April 2014 that hull numbers MHC-51, 54, 56, 57, 58, and 62 were up for auction to be sold as an entire lot for "dismantlement purposes only." This contradicted earlier information announcing the sale of some of these vessels to foreign operators. The minehunting role of this class is to be taken over by Littoral Combat Ships equipped with the Mine Counter-Measures Module.

Ships

See also

  – The Italian ship design on which the Osprey class was based
  – US ocean-going class
  – Franco-Benelux contemporary

Notes

References

Federation of American Scientists: MHC 51 Osprey Coastal Mine Hunters
 26 Mar 2014 MHC 51, 54, 56, 57 58, 62 are on GSA auction web site for "DISMANTLEMENT" out of Beaumont, TX. http://gsaauctions.gov/gsaauctions/aucindx/

External links
 
NavSource.org: Coastal Minesweeper/Coastal Minehunter Index

Mine warfare vessel classes